The 2000 Next Generation Adelaide International was a men's ATP tennis tournament held in Adelaide, Australia and played on outdoor hardcourts. It was the 23rd edition of the tournament and was held from 3 January until 9 January 2000. Lleyton Hewitt won his first title of the year and the 3rd of his career.

Finals

Singles

 Lleyton Hewitt defeated  Thomas Enqvist 3–6, 6–3, 6–2

Doubles

 Todd Woodbridge /  Mark Woodforde defeated  Lleyton Hewitt /  Sandon Stolle 6–4, 6–2

References

External links
 ITF – Tournament details

Aapt Championships, 2000
Next Generation Adelaide International
2000s in Adelaide
January 2000 sports events in Australia